The Croatian Sovereignists are a conservative and Christian right-wing political party in Croatia. The party was founded in 2019 and is led by Marijan Pavliček.

History

Foundation 
The party was originally founded in November 2019 as a political platform between the Croatian Conservative Party, Hrast-Movement for Successful Croatia, and some citizens' initiatives, such as "Istina o Istanbulskoj" and "Hrvatski bedem".

2020 parliamentary election 

In 2020, the party entered the Sabor (Croatian Parliament) in a Homeland Movement-led coalition. As of 2021, the Croatian Sovereignists have four MPs in the Sabor.

Merge of smaller right-wing parties 
On October 2, 2021, a unification assembly was held in Croatia's capital Zagreb. During the assembly it was announced, that three smaller conservative and right-wing parties (Croatian Conservative Party, Hrast-Movement for Successful Croatia and the Generation of Renewal) will become defunct to merge and work together as the Croatian Sovereignists.

Expulsion of Zekanović from the party 
On December 17, the presidency of the Croatian Sovereignists launched proceedings to expel Hrvoje Zekanović from the party, which was conducted on January 17. The final decision will be made within 30 days. Zekanović surprised everyone with a speech about vaccinations in the Croatian Parliament a week earlier on Thursday, which was followed by his removal as a president of a parliamentary club and Hrvoje Zekanović was officially expelled from the Croatian Sovereign Party on January 19, 2022.

"Protect the Croatian Kuna" 
After Andrej Plenković (HDZ), the Prime Minister of Croatia, announced that he expects Croatia to join the eurozone by the beginning of 2023, the Croatian Sovereignists launched a campaign called "Protect the Croatian Kuna". Hrvoje Zekanović announced that the Sovereignists will start collecting signatures for a referendum and claimed that "not a single citizen of the Republic of Croatia out of two-thirds who voted for the EU knew that we had committed ourselves to introduce the euro within a certain period of time, ie enter the eurozone." Sovereignist Member of Parliament Marijan Pavliček argued in a parliament speech that: "such an important topic where part of the sovereignty is lost, in this case monetary sovereignty, cannot be decided by individuals in their offices after an agreement with the powers in Brussels. On this topic only the Croatian people can decide through a referendum."

The initiative is also supported by the Croatian Party of Rights, the Independents for Croatia, and Generation of Renewal.

On October 24, 2021, the "Protect the Croatian Kuna" initiative started collecting signatures demanding a referendum. Sovereignist Member of Parliament Marko Milanović Litre said in an interview, that already after five days 157,000 signatures were collected. For a referendum on the subject, the initiative needs to gather 368,867 signatures by November 7, 2021. After the collection of signatures was over, the Sovereignists announced that they had collected 334,582 valid signatures, which is not enough to call a referendum.

Program 
On its website, the party names:
 national sovereignty
 self-sustainability
 Christian values
 personal freedoms
as its program guidelines.

Election results

Legislative

See also 
 List of political parties in Croatia

References

External links 

2019 establishments in Croatia
Conservative parties in Croatia
Christian political parties
Eurosceptic parties in Croatia
Right-wing politics in Croatia
Political parties established in 2019